The UEFA Second Round was contested by the best eight runners-up from the nine first round groups from the UEFA segment of the qualification tournament for the 2018 FIFA World Cup final tournament. The winners — Croatia, Denmark, Sweden, and Switzerland — of each of four home and away ties joined the group winners in the World Cup in Russia. These pairs of matches, also commonly known as the playoffs, were held in November 2017. The losers were Greece, Italy, Northern Ireland and Republic of Ireland.

The draw for the ties was held in Zürich on 17 October 2017, with the October 2017 FIFA World Rankings being used in deciding which of the teams would be seeded.

Qualified teams
The eight best runners-up from the UEFA First Round qualified for the play-offs; at the time of the draw, with two groups having one team fewer than the others, matches against the sixth-placed team in each First Round group were discarded in this ranking even after the admission of Gibraltar and Kosovo, and with all groups now containing six teams. As a result, eight matches played by each team counted for the purposes of ranking the runners-up.

Ranking of the runner-up teams
The eight best runners-up were determined by the following parameters, in this order:
 Highest number of points
 Goal difference
 Highest number of goals scored
 Fair play points
 Drawing of lots

Seeding and draw
The second round draw took place on 17 October 2017 at 14:00 CEST (UTC+2), at the FIFA headquarters in Zürich, Switzerland. Teams were seeded based on October 2017 FIFA World Rankings (shown below in brackets), with each tie seeing a seeded team drawn against an unseeded team. Each tie's order of legs was decided as part of the draw.

The draw was conducted by Mexican TV presenter Vanessa Huppenkothen with the assistance of former Spain international Fernando Hierro.

Playoffs
The first legs were played on 9–11 November, and the second legs were played on 12–14 November 2017.

Times are CET (UTC+1) as listed by UEFA (local times are in parentheses).

Switzerland won 1–0 on aggregate and qualified for the 2018 FIFA World Cup.

Croatia won 4–1 on aggregate and qualified for the 2018 FIFA World Cup.

Denmark won 5–1 on aggregate and qualified for the 2018 FIFA World Cup.

Sweden won 1–0 on aggregate and qualified for the 2018 FIFA World Cup.

Goalscorers
There were 13 goals scored in 8 matches, for an average of  goals per match.

3 goals

 Christian Eriksen

1 goal

 Nikola Kalinić
 Andrej Kramarić
 Luka Modrić
 Ivan Perišić
 Nicklas Bendtner
 Andreas Christensen
 Sokratis Papastathopoulos
 Shane Duffy
 Jakob Johansson
 Ricardo Rodríguez

Discipline
A player was automatically suspended for the next match for the following offences:
 Receiving a red card (red card suspensions could be extended for serious offences)
 Receiving two yellow cards in two different matches (yellow card suspensions were carried forward to the play-offs, but not the finals or any other future international matches)

The following suspensions were served during the qualifying matches:

References

External links

Qualifiers – Europe: Round 2, FIFA.com
FIFA World Cup, UEFA.com

play-off
2017–18 in Greek football
2017–18 in Italian football
2017 in Republic of Ireland association football
2017–18 in Northern Ireland association football
2017 in Swedish football
Switzerland at the 2018 FIFA World Cup
Croatia at the 2018 FIFA World Cup
Denmark at the 2018 FIFA World Cup
Sweden at the 2018 FIFA World Cup
November 2017 sports events in Europe